Dmitryivanovite is a natural mineral composed of calcium, aluminium and oxygen, with the molecular formula CaAl2O4. It was reported in 2009 in a calcium-aluminium-rich inclusion in the carbonaceous chondrite meteorite 470 (NWA470) CH3, which landed in North Africa. The mineral name was chosen to honor Dmitriy A. Ivanov (1962–1986), a geologist, mineralogist, and petrologist who died on a field expedition.

It is the high-pressure CaAl2O4 dimorph of krotite.

See also
 Glossary of meteoritics

References

Calcium minerals
Aluminium minerals
Oxide minerals
Meteorite minerals
Monoclinic minerals
Minerals in space group 14